Animal Liberation: A New Ethics for Our Treatment of Animals is a 1975 book by Australian philosopher Peter Singer. It is widely considered within the animal liberation movement to be the founding philosophical statement of its ideas. Singer himself rejected the use of the theoretical framework of rights when it comes to human and nonhuman animals.  Following Jeremy Bentham, Singer argued that the interests of animals should be considered because of their ability to experience suffering and that the idea of rights was not necessary in order to consider them. He popularized the term "speciesism" in the book, which had been coined by Richard D. Ryder to describe the exploitative treatment of animals.

Summary
Singer allows that animal rights are not the same as human rights, writing in Animal Liberation that "there are obviously important differences between humans and other animals, and these differences must give rise to some differences in the rights that each have."

In Animal Liberation, Singer argues against what he calls speciesism: discrimination on the grounds that a being belongs to a certain species. He holds the interests of all beings capable of suffering to be worthy of equal consideration and that giving lesser consideration to beings based on their species is no more justified than discrimination based on skin color. He argues that animals' rights should be based on their capacity to feel pain more than on their intelligence. In particular, he argues that while animals show lower intelligence than the average human, many severely intellectually challenged humans show equally diminished, if not lower, mental capacity and that some animals have displayed signs of intelligence (for example, primates learning elements of American sign language and other symbolic languages) sometimes on a par with that of human children. Therefore, intelligence does not provide a basis for giving nonhuman animals any less consideration than such intellectually challenged humans.  Singer concludes that the most practical solution is to adopt a vegetarian or vegan diet. He also condemns vivisection except where the benefit (in terms of improved medical treatment, etc.) outweighs the harm done to the animals used.

Reception
Activist Ingrid Newkirk wrote of Animal Liberation, "It forever changed the conversation about our treatment of animals. It made people—myself included—change what we ate, what we wore, and how we perceived animals."  Other activists who claim that their attitudes to animals changed after reading the book include Peter Tatchell and Matt Ball.

Singer has expressed regret that the book did not have more impact. In September 1999, he was quoted by Michael Specter in The New Yorker on the book's impact:
It's had effects around the margins, of course, but they have mostly been minor. When I wrote it, I really thought the book would change the world. I know it sounds a little grand now, but at the time the sixties still existed for us. It looked as if real changes were possible, and I let myself believe that this would be one of them. All you have to do is walk around the corner to McDonald's to see how successful I have been.

The book has also received a wide range of philosophical challenges to his formulation of animal rights. In a lengthy debate in Slate Magazine, published in 2001, Richard Posner wrote, among other things, that Singer failed to see the "radicalism of the ethical vision that powers [his] view on animals, an ethical vision that finds greater value in a healthy pig than in a profoundly intellectually challenged child, that commands inflicting a lesser pain on a human being to avert a greater pain to a dog, and that, provided only that a chimpanzee has 1 percent of the mental ability of a normal human being, would require the sacrifice of the human being to save 101 chimpanzees." Singer replied to and rejected this claim, engaging in a  lengthy debate with Posner.

In addition, Martha Nussbaum has argued that the capability approach provides a more adequate foundation of justice than Utilitarianism can supply. Utilitarianism, Nussbaum argues, ignores adaptive preferences, elides the separateness of distinct persons, misidentifies valuable human/non-human emotions such as grief, and calculates according to "sum-rankings" rather than inviolable protection of intrinsic entitlements.

Roger Scruton, a moral philosopher who criticised Singer's work for what Scruton said was false equivalence between animal and human consciousness and the pejorative use of utilitarianism, singled Animal Liberation for criticism. He wrote that Singer's works, including Animal Liberation (1975), "contain little or no philosophical argument. They derive their radical moral conclusions from a vacuous utilitarianism that counts the pain and pleasure of all living things as equally significant and that ignores just about everything that has been said in our philosophical tradition about the real distinction between persons and animals."

Personal background
In an essay entitled "Animal Liberation: A Personal View", Singer describes the personal background that led to his adoption of the views he sets out in Animal Liberation. He writes of how he arrived in Oxford in October 1969, and in 1970 had lunch with a fellow graduate student, Richard Keshen, who avoided meat. This led Singer to inquire as to why. Singer then read Ruth Harrison's book, Animal Machines, as well as a paper by Roslind Godlovitch (who would later co-edit Animals, Men and Morals), which convinced him to become a vegetarian and to take animal suffering seriously as a philosophical issue.

See also
 Tom Regan
 List of vegan media

Notes
. This grossly oversimplifies Mill's position as regards 'act' and 'rule' utilitarianism, which is usefully summarised here Can a utilitarian respect rights? by Chris Lyons

References

1975 non-fiction books
Books about animal rights
Books about animal testing
Books by Peter Singer
English-language books
Ethics books
HarperCollins books
Vegetarian-related mass media
Works about utilitarianism